Morial is a surname. Notable people with the surname include:

Ernest Nathan Morial (1929–1989), American politician and civic leader
New Orleans Morial Convention Center
Marc Morial (born 1958), American politician and civic leader, son of Ernest